Cazzago San Martino is a comune in the province of Brescia, in Lombardy in Franciacorta.  It is bounded by other communes of Rovato, Ospitaletto.

Geography

References

Cities and towns in Lombardy